Sammie Marquez Benson (born April 8, 1990), professionally known as Blac Youngsta, is an American rapper from Memphis, Tennessee. He is signed to Yo Gotti's label Collective Music Group (CMG) and Epic Records. After a series of mixtapes upon being signed, his 2017 single "Hip Hopper" and 2018 single "Booty", became the most successful, with the latter peaking at number 73 on the Billboard Hot 100. Both songs appear on his debut studio album 223 (2019), which peaked at number 42 on the Billboard 200.

Early life 
Sammie Marquez Benson was born on April 8, 1990, and raised in McMillan Street, a poor area in South Memphis, Tennessee. Benson and his younger brothers were raised by their grandparents. Despite both of his grandparents having jobs, they earned very little and struggled to put food on the table. Benson's grandfather managed to get him a job at a local grocery store when he was just 7 years old, however, he was fired when the manager caught him placing fake orders to the store in order to take the food home for him and his brothers. After losing his job at the store, Benson began selling drugs and served numerous sentences in prison for drug and gun charges. In 2012, after serving a year in prison, Benson began hosting local block parties which made him locally popular in South Memphis. Shortly after, he began pursuing a career in music, releasing his debut mixtape Fast Bricks in 2012.

Career

2012–2016: Early career and signing to CMG 
Taking the stage name Blac Youngsta, Benson began taking a career in music more seriously in 2012, releasing three mixtapes as part of his Fast Bricks series, from 2012 to 2014.

His breakout song "Heavy" was released in 2015, and gained the attention of Yo Gotti, who appeared on the song's remix and signed Blac Youngsta to his Collective Music Group label. Blac Youngsta's first mixtape as a member of CMG, I Swear To God, was released on September 24, 2015, and featured guest appearances from Yo Gotti and Boosie Badazz. In March 2016, Blac Youngsta released a mixtape titled Young & Reckless, followed by Fuck Everybody, released in September 2016, with features from Young Thug, Quavo, Jacquees and YFN Lucci.

2017–2019: Epic Records and major label debut 
In February 2017, Blac Youngsta released Illuminati, his fourth mixtape as a member of CMG, with guest appearances from Kodak Black, Lil Yachty and Slim Jxmmi. After Blac Youngsta turned himself in for his involvement in a shooting targeted towards Yo Gotti's longtime rival, Young Dolph, a "Free Blac Youngsta" grassroots movement was started, with fellow rapper Young Thug releasing a song of the same name on May 17, 2017. After his release, Blac Youngsta established his own label imprint under CMG, Heavy Camp, and released a mixtape titled, I'm Innocent, in June 2017, with guest appearances from Slim Jxmmi and Ty Dolla Sign. In December 2017, Blac Youngsta signed his first major label deal with Epic Records.

In February 2018, Youngsta released his debut studio album, 223, through Epic, with guest appearances from Lil Yachty, Travis Scott and French Montana. The album charted on the Billboard 200, peaking at number 42. The album also spawned the successful single "Booty", which charted on the Billboard Hot 100, peaking at number 73 and was certified Gold by the Recording Industry Association of America (RIAA). In August 2018, Blac Youngsta released a sequel to his 2016 mixtape, Fuck Everybody, with Fuck Everybody 2, featuring a sole guest appearance from Lil Pump, which also charted on the Billboard 200, peaking at number 63.

In May 2019, Blac Youngsta released his EP, Cut Up. In August 2019, Blac Youngsta announced via Twitter that his second studio album will be called Church on Sunday. In October 2019, Blac Youngsta also announced an international tour of the same name, starting in November 2019. Church on Sunday was released at the end of the same month.

2020–present: More charting singles 
In January 2020, he was featured on Moneybagg Yo's song "1 2 3", which would later be released as a single in April 2020 and chart on the Hot R&B/Hip-Hop Songs chart, earning him his second charting single on that chart.

Heavy Camp 
Heavy Camp is a record label imprint under Yo Gotti's Collective Music Group (CMG) founded by Blac Youngsta in 2017. The current president of the label is Julien Anderson.

Current artists 
 
 Lil Migo

Personal life

Legal issues 
On January 8, 2016, Police were called to a Wells Fargo branch in downtown Atlanta, Georgia after Blac Youngsta withdrew $200,000 from his bank account in order to purchase a car. Workers allegedly believed Blac Youngsta was robbing the bank after he was seen leaving the bank with the money. Youngsta and his associates were released at the scene. Youngsta later accused the police and staff at the bank of racial profiling, claiming he was arrested for being "young and black".

On May 16, 2017, Blac Youngsta surrendered himself to police on charges related to a shooting involving fellow Memphis rapper Young Dolph, in which Youngsta and his associates are alleged to have fired over 100 rounds into Young Dolph's SUV. Blac Youngsta had maintained that he was innocent before turning himself in. He was released on bond the same day, charged with six counts of discharging a weapon into an occupied dwelling or moving vehicle and felony conspiracy. In May 2019, the charges were dropped.

Discography

Studio albums

Compilation albums

Mixtapes

Extended plays

Singles

As lead artist

As featured artist 

Notes

Awards and nominations

ASCAP Rhythm & Soul Music Awards 

|-
| rowspan="1" style="text-align:center;"|2019
| style="text-align:left;"|"Booty"
|rowspan="1" style="text-align:center;"| Award Winning R&B/Hip Hop Songs
| 
|-

Tours

Headlining 

I Swear to God Tour (2015)
Young & Reckless Tour (2016)
I'm Innocent Tour (2017)
Pull Up Tour (2018)
Church on Sunday International Tour (2019)

References

External links 
 
 

1990 births
Living people
African-American male rappers
21st-century African-American male singers
Epic Records artists
Rappers from Memphis, Tennessee
Singers from Memphis, Tennessee
Southern hip hop musicians
21st-century American rappers
21st-century American male singers
21st-century American singers